"The Song of the Heart" is a song written and performed by Prince for the 2006 film Happy Feet.

The song came about when Prince was approached to allow his song "Kiss" to appear in the film. Prince was initially hesitant to sign off on its use, but agreed to watch the film before he made a final decision. Executives from Warner Bros. screened Happy Feet for Prince at his Paisley Park recording complex, and he enjoyed the film so much that he agreed to the use of "Kiss" and offered to write a new song for the film. Warner Bros. executive Darren Higman said that Prince completed "The Song of the Heart" approximately one week after he was screened the film. It is the only song on the soundtrack specifically written for the film.

Music video
A music video was produced to promote the single.

Awards

|-
| 2007 || Golden Globe Award || Best Original Song || 
|-
| 2008 || Grammy Award || Best Song Written for Visual Media || 
|}

References

Prince (musician) songs
2006 songs
Songs written by Prince (musician)
Song recordings produced by Prince (musician)

Best Original Song Golden Globe winning songs
Atlantic Records singles